Bruce Genesoke Ohr is a former United States Department of Justice official. A former associate deputy attorney general and former director of the Organized Crime Drug Enforcement Task Force (OCDETF), as of February 2018 Ohr was working in the Justice Department's Criminal Division. He is an expert on transnational organized crime and has spent most of his career overseeing gang and racketeering-related prosecutions, including Russian organized crime.

Ohr was little-known until 2018, when he became the subject of scrutiny when he was involved in the start of the Russian interference in the 2016 election probe. He was criticized by President Donald Trump, who accused Ohr of abusing his access to sensitive information. No evidence has emerged that Ohr was involved in the initiation of the Russia probe or that Ohr mishandled sensitive information. According to a comprehensive review by ABC News, Ohr "had little impact on the FBI’s growing probe into Trump and his associates." The Department of Justice Inspector General reported that Ohr had made "consequential errors in judgment" in failing to inform his supervisors about his role in the investigation.

On September 30, 2020, Ohr retired from his position at DOJ "after his counsel was informed that a final decision on a disciplinary review being conducted by Department senior career officials was imminent".

Early life and education
Bruce Ohr is of Korean heritage, being the child of Korean immigrants. He graduated from Harvard College in 1984 with a degree in physics and graduated from Harvard Law School in 1987.

Career 

Ohr worked for a law firm in San Francisco before becoming a career civil servant at the U.S. Department of Justice, ultimately rising to the rank of associate deputy attorney general. He was an assistant U.S. Attorney in the Southern District of New York from 1991 to 1999, and was head of the office's Violent Gangs Unit before joining the Justice Department's Washington headquarters as the head of the Organized Crime and Racketeering Section of the Criminal Division, where Ohr managed teams investigating and prosecuting crime syndicates in Russia and eastern Europe. In 2006, Ohr was one of a number of U.S. government officials who made the decision to revoke the visa of Oleg Deripaska, a Russian oligarch and Vladimir Putin ally.

In 2010, Ohr moved to a new position as counsel for international relations in DOJ's Transnational organized crime and international affairs section. In 2014 he became director of the Organized Crime Drug Enforcement Task Force (OCDETF).

In 2014–2016, Bruce Ohr was involved in a wide–ranging clandestine effort by the U.S. government to recruit Russia's richest men close to Vladimir Putin, such as Oleg Deripaska, as informants for the U.S. government. During this time, Ohr had contacts with the former British intelligence officer Christopher Steele, whom he had first met in 2007. Steele was also involved in this effort. Steele later authored the Steele dossier in 2016. The New York Times reported that this recruitment effort did not "appear to have scored any successes"; and in Deripaska's case, Deripaska is said to have even notified the Russian authorities about the American effort to recruit him.

Ohr later became associate deputy attorney general, but lost that position in late 2017, although he remained director of OCDETF for a time. Ohr was later demoted by the Department of Justice amid the Senate Intelligence Committee's discovery of his meetings with Christopher Steele and Fusion GPS founder Glenn Simpson.

Russia probe 

Ohr had repeated contacts with FBI agents during the fall and winter of 2016–2017, where he shared information he had received from Steele's dossier research. During this time, Ohr failed to inform his supervisors in the Justice Department of his role, actions which were "shocking" to Rod Rosenstein when he learned of Ohr's role. Rosenstein stated that Ohr "appeared to be serving as an 'intermediary' with Steele". The dossier was prepared under a contract to the DNC and the Clinton campaign, by the opposition research firm Fusion GPS. During the 2016 election, Bruce's wife, Nellie Ohr, a Russia specialist, worked for Fusion GPS as an independent contractor. Nellie Ohr, according to a Republican-led investigation, conducted "research and analysis" of Donald Trump for Fusion GPS. An ABC News report stated that Nellie Ohr "was not directly involved in the 'dossier' while she worked for Fusion GPS."

Steele had been an official source of intelligence for the FBI in the Russian-interference probe before the election, until he was terminated as a source in November 2016 for unauthorized contacts with the media.  Following the election, Steele continued to provide information to Ohr at the Justice Department, who forwarded this information to the FBI. FBI agents interviewed Ohr a dozen times regarding contacts with Steele, recording interviews in classified form "302 reports". Ohr, himself, also documented the contacts in 63 pages of unclassified notes and emails. Ohr's contacts with Steele were mentioned in the controversial Nunes memo, written by Devin Nunes, chair of the Republican-led House Intelligence Committee, which was released in February 2018.

The Nunes memo, which focused on the Justice Department's process for obtaining a FISA warrant to wiretap Trump associate Carter Page in October 2016, said that Ohr was aware of Steele's bias against Trump in September 2016. The memo alleged that Steele's reported bias against Trump was not mentioned in the FISA warrant application and that the FISA court was misled. A competing memo by Democrats on the House Intelligence Committee said that the FISA warrant made clear that the Steele dossier was paid opposition research likely intended to discredit the Trump campaign in the 2016 election and that the court was therefore not misled. Ohr documented Steele's opinions on Trump in November 2016 (several weeks after the initial FISA warrant against Page had been approved by the FISA court), saying Steele "was desperate that Donald Trump not get elected and was passionate about him not being president." Ohr was not assigned to work in counterintelligence operations and was not known to be involved in obtaining the FISA warrant. According to BBC News, the fact that Ohr recorded Steele's opinions "somewhat [undercuts] the accusation of rampant bias within the department, given that a truly compromised individual wouldn't jot that sort of thing down."

In 2018, Ohr became the subject of right-wing conspiracy theories which alleged that he played an important role in starting the probe into Russian interference in the 2016 election. The conspiracy theories allege that the origins of the Russia probe were biased and were intended to undermine then-candidate Trump. President Trump and many Republicans have falsely claimed the Steele dossier was used to start the investigation. But in fact the July 2016 launch of the FBI investigation was triggered, not by the dossier, but by a report that Trump campaign advisor George Papadopoulos knew, before it became public knowledge, that the Russians possessed damaging information about Hillary Clinton in the form of "thousands" of stolen emails. This origin of the probe is confirmed in the Nunes memo itself. Deputy Attorney General Rod Rosenstein has stated that as far as he knew, Ohr was not involved with the Russia investigation, and told the House Judiciary Committee that Ohr had "no role" in the investigation. The claim that the origins of the Russia probe were tainted is unsubstantiated. The FBI did not publicly reveal the ongoing investigation into the Trump campaign during the campaign, in part so as not to hurt his electoral chances, contradicting the claim that the probe was an attempt to undermine Trump's candidacy.

Trump called Ohr a "disgrace" in a tweet in August 2018 and suggested that he would revoke Ohr's security clearance. There is no publicly available evidence that suggests Ohr mishandled sensitive information. Trump's threat to strip Ohr of his security clearance came amid threats to revoke the security clearances of a number of current and former officials who had criticized Trump or been involved in the Russia probe. According to The Washington Post, White House press secretary Sarah Huckabee Sanders and her deputy Bill Shine discussed the best timing to announce the revocations as a way of distracting from unfavorable news cycles. Rep. Jim Jordan, a critic of the probe into Russian interference in the 2016 election, called for Ohr's firing.

On August 28, 2018, Ohr gave testimony in a closed hearing to two Republican-led House committees looking into decisions made by the DOJ ahead of the 2016 presidential election.

See also 

 Russian interference in the 2016 United States elections

References

External links 

 Bruce Genesoke Ohr, State Bar of California listing
 

American lawyers
Drug Enforcement Administration personnel
Harvard College alumni
Harvard Law School alumni
American people of South Korean descent
Lawyers who have represented the United States government
Living people
People associated with Russian interference in the 2016 United States elections
Place of birth missing (living people)
Year of birth missing (living people)